Herscher is a village in Kankakee County, Illinois, United States. The population was 1,521 at the 2020 census. It is part of the Kankakee–Bradley metropolitan area.

Geography
Herscher is located in southwestern Kankakee County at  (41.050716, -88.095404). Illinois Route 115 forms the northern edge of the village; the highway leads east  to Kankakee, the county seat, and southwest  to Piper City.

Demographics

As of the census of 2000, there were 1,523 people, 533 households, and 430 families residing in the village. The racial makeup of the village was 97.96% White, 0.20% African American, 0.53% Native American, 0.20% Asian, 0.26% from other races, and 0.85% from two or more races. Hispanic or Latino of any race were 0.53% of the population.
There were 533 households, out of which 43.5% had children under the age of 18 living with them, 65.9% were married couples living together, 10.3% had a female householder with no husband present, and 19.3% were non-families. 17.3% of all households were made up of individuals, and 8.8% had someone living alone who was 65 years of age or older. The average household size was 2.86 and the average family size was 3.21.
In the village, the population was spread out, with 31.3% under the age of 18, 9.1% from 18 to 24, 28.1% from 25 to 44, 18.4% from 45 to 64, and 13.1% who were 65 years of age or older. The median age was 33 years. For every 100 females, there were 99.3 males. For every 100 females age 18 and over, there were 95.3 males
The median income for a household in the village was $48,250, and the median income for a family was $56,583. Males had a median income of $41,012 versus $25,086 for females. The per capita income for the village was $18,522. About 4.8% of families and 7.7% of the population were below the poverty line, including 10.4% of those under age 18 and 3.1% of those age 65 or over.

Education 
Herscher is the central location of the Herscher Community School District #2. Herscher has a grade school, junior high, and high school. It is the only high school in the district

Notable people 

 Chris Bisaillon, College Football Hall of Fame inductee
 Brooke Langton, model and actress
 Scott Meents, professional basketball player for Chicago Bulls, Seattle SuperSonics, Utah Jazz
 Steve Reick, member of the Illinois House of Representatives

References

External links
Herscher Chamber of Commerce
Herscher Community School District #2

Villages in Kankakee County, Illinois
Villages in Illinois